NU-Tech is a digital signal processing (DSP) platform to validate and real-time debug complex algorithms, simply relying on a common PC. It is based on a typical plug-in architecture and thanks to a  free software development kit (SDK), the developer can write his own plug-in (aka NUTSs = NU-Tech Satellites) in C++.

NUTSs are not compelled to provide a GUI. To ease the developer in quickly creating new NUTSs without having to deal with GUI programming, NU-Tech provides a window called "RealTime Watch" to be associated to each NUTS (a tab on the NU-Tech bottom Multitab pane).
The developer chooses, by code, whether to "expose" some NUTSs' internal variables on this window, in order to control his plug-in.

NU-Tech can connect to the external world by means of interchangeable drivers. For audio real-time applications ASIO 2.1 has been adopted in order to guarantee minimum and repeatable latencies, fully exploiting compatible sound cards hardware resources.

NU-Tech is freeware for non-commercial use.

Available features
 Audio streaming
 Video streaming and synchronization mechanism
 Virtual Studio Technology support
 ASIO 2.1 support
 DirectX support
 Performance_analysis information
 Free SDK

References

Papers about NU-Tech applications

See also
 Digital audio editors

Acoustics software
Windows-only freeware